Bardia, also El Burdi or Barydiyah ( or ) is a Mediterranean seaport in the Butnan District of eastern Libya, located near the border with Egypt. It is also occasionally called Bórdi Slemán.

History

In Roman times the town was known as Petras Maior.

During World War I, German U-boats made several landings in the port of Bardia in support of the Senussi order during the Senussi Campaign.

During World War II, it was the site of a major Italian fortification, invested by the XXIII Corps under the command of General Annibale Bergonzoli. On 21 June 1940, the town was bombarded by the 7th Cruiser Squadron of the Mediterranean Fleet. The bombardment caused minimal damage. The town was taken during Operation Compass by Commonwealth forces consisting mainly of the Australian 6th Division in fighting over 3–5 January 1941 at the Battle of Bardia.

The Axis later reoccupied the town and set up a prisoner of war camp there. On 2 January 1942, Bardia was re-taken by the South African 2nd Infantry Division, led by 1st Battalion, Royal Durban Light Infantry, supported by the New Zealand Divisional Cavalry Regiment and also the South African 2nd Anti-Aircraft Brigade (Light Anti-Aircraft). The South Africans lost approximately 160 men, and the operation freed about 1,150 Allied prisoners of war (including 650 New Zealanders) and took some 8,500 Axis prisoners (German and Italian).

Bardia again changed hands in June 1942, being re-occupied by Axis forces for a third time, but was abandoned without contest in November following the Allied victory at El Alamein.

Bardia is the location of the Bardia Mural, finished in 1942.

References

Further reading 
 Agar-Hamilton, J. A. I. and L. C. F. Turner. The Sidi Rezegh Battles, 1941. Cape Town: Oxford University Press, 1957.
 Stevens, William George (1962). Bardia to Enfidaville. War History Branch, New Zealand Department of Internal Affairs, Wellington, New Zealand, ; history of New Zealand troops in North Africa in World War II

External links 
 

Cyrenaica
Populated places in Butnan District
Port cities and towns in Libya